Ontonagon may refer to several places in Michigan, United States:

 Ontonagon, Michigan
 Ontonagon Township, Michigan
 Ontonagon County, Michigan
 Ontonagon River
 Ontonagon Indian Reservation
 Ontonagon Boulder, a massive rock of pure copper